Jon Brennan (born 19 May 1981) was a Jersey rugby player who played at prop for Jersey Reds He worked as a history teacher at Le Rocquier School, and previously at De La Salle College and now works as a history teacher at Les Quennevais School.

External links 
 Jon Brennan Playing Statistics at Statbunker.com

References

1981 births
British rugby union players
Jersey Reds players
Jersey rugby union players
Living people
Jersey sportsmen
Rugby union props